Masdevallia floribunda is a species of orchid found from southern Mexico to Honduras.

References

External links 

floribunda
Orchids of Central America
Orchids of Belize
Orchids of Honduras
Orchids of Mexico